The Basibasy mine is one of the largest titanium mines in Madagascar. The mine is located in Atsimo-Andrefana. The mine has reserves amounting to 446 million tonnes of ore grading 5.5% titanium.

References 

Titanium mines in Madagascar